The Type 082 class minesweeper is a Chinese People's Liberation Army Navy (PLAN) ship class.  It is also known as Wosao class in the west, but the Chinese media has translated the name as Wusao, short for armed (Wu-zhuang, 武裝) mine sweeping boat (Sao-lei-ting, 掃雷). As with most mine countermeasure vessels in PLAN, all Type 082 ships are also equipped with mine laying rails and thus are also deployed as minelayers.

Type 082 mine countermeasure vessel

The Type 082 mine countermeasure vessel with NATO reporting name Wosao I class is the successor to the Type 058 and Type 7102 minesweepers.

Although both Type 058 and Type 7102 met their requirements, the backwardness of Chinese industrial and manufacturing capabilities limited both classes from being mass-produced, resulting in only 20 Type 058 minesweeper and a single Type 7102 minesweeper being built. Decision was made to have a new class of minesweeper based on the technical experience gained from both classes, along with lessons learned from the deployment of Type 312 minesweeper in North Vietnam, and this is the origin of 082 minesweeper. This project was first issued in 1976 during the 3rd Conference on Mine Countermeasure Equipment, but due to the political turmoil in China, namely, the Cultural Revolution, construction did not begun until 1984. The type was jointly designed by the 708th and 710th institutes, and Jiangxin (江新) Shipbuilding Factory in Jiangxi was the contractor, with the first unit entering service in 1987. The general designer was Mr. Ma Jinghua (馬錦華), the same general designer of Wolei class minelayer.  This class was consequently upgraded by doubling the number of engines and shafts, and most units were built by the Wusong Shipyard at Shanghai. Originally completed as minesweepers, these ships are subsequently incorporated mine-hunting capability during later upgrades.

This minesweeper carries Type 317 magnetic sweeping gear, Type 318 mechanical sweeping gear, Type 318 acoustic sweeping gear, and Type 319 infrasonic sweeping gear, and it can also be used as a minelayer with capability to carry 6 mines.  The boat is powered by 4 M50 diesel, and more than half a dozen have entered Chinese service.  The Pennant number of these units changed to 800's series in 2004 from the original 4400's.

Type 082I mine countermeasure vessel
Type 082I mine countermeasure vessel is the follow-on design of the original Type 082, with slight increase in displacement to more than 400 tons. A dozen of this type have been built and entered PLAN service after 2000. Not all unit of this class had the same equipment as they were built, with some later units had additional mine-hunting equipment installed, which was back-fitted to earlier units, as well as it predecessor Type 082. Type 082I has received NATO reporting name Wosao II class.

Type 082II mine countermeasure vessel
Type 082II mine countermeasure vessel wth NATO reporting name Wozang-class is the modern development of the base Type 082. The first unit of the Type 082II-class, named Huoqiu on April 23, 2005, was launched in 2004 and entered Chinese service in June 2005 with pennant number 804. From the design to its completion, it took more than a decade and cost over 600 million Yuan Renminbi. The Chinese industrial and manufacturing capability are finally mature enough to produce minesweepers with components built of fiberglass and steel with low magnetic signature at an acceptable price, but the exact content is unknown due to lack of official governmental sources. Some Chinese internet websites claim that the superstructure is built with fiberglass and the hull was built with low magnetic signature steel, while others claim that the entire boat was built of fiberglass.

The second unit with pennant number 818 named Kunshan, entered service in December 2011. Some Chinese internet sources have claimed that this second unit is an all fiberglass construction boat, while the first was fiberglass superstructure mounted on low magnetic signature steel hull, because it took about half a decade for Chinese shipyards to master all fiberglass construction for boats of this size, but as with other claims about this class, all have yet to be verified by official or governmental sources. Built by Qiuxin Shipyard at Shanghai, Type 082II mine countermeasure vesselis known in the West as the Wozang-class.

Specifications:
Length: 55 meter
Beam: 9.3 meter
Draft: 2.6 meter
Displacement: 575 ton
Armament: 1 twin 25 mm gun

Type 529 minesweeper
Type 082II mine countermeasure vessel can work independently, but it can also work as a mother ship for the small Type 529 minesweeper. Three units of this class have been observed, with pennant numbers 8181, 8182 and 8183 respectively, and they are observed usually with Type 082II-class Kunshan (818).

Although designed to work mainly in conjunction with Type 082II, these boats can also work independently or with other larger mine countermeasure vessels in the PLAN. The Type 529 minesweeper appears to be the logical successor of Type 312 minesweeper, in that like its predecessor, Type 529 minesweeper can be either manned or operated remotely.

Ships

References

Minesweepers of the People's Liberation Army Navy
Minesweepers of the Vietnam People's Navy